Shoguna is a genus of beetles in the family Monotomidae, containing the following species:

 Shoguna chlorotica (Fairmaire, 1886)
 Shoguna feae Grouvelle, 1896
 Shoguna longiceps (Grouvelle, 1896)
 Shoguna rufotestacea Lewis, 1884
 Shoguna sicardi Grouvelle, 1906
 Shoguna striata Arrow, 1900
 Shoguna termitiformis (Fairmaire, 1883)

References

Cucujoidea genera
Monotomidae